Livy Jeanne (born in Thunder Bay, Ontario) is a Canadian country music singer.

Career 
Jeanne won the 13-17-year-old division of the Global Country Star Search in Edmonton in May 2010. She released her debut single, "Invisible", in January 2012 about her experience being bullied in school. She toured schools across Alberta in 2012 on her You Don't Have to Be Invisible Tour. She was nominated for Artist to Watch at the Edmonton Music Awards in April 2012. In November 2012, she released an extended play, Under the Radar, via Black Box Music.

In July 2013, Jeanne released the single "Any Other Way". It peaked at number 42 on the Billboard Canada Country chart.

Recent songwriting highlights include securing a cut on The Shires album My Universe, which peaked at No. 3 on the UK Billboard Charts. Her song "Daddy's Little Girl" is currently the band's newest single.

Livy's two latest singles, "Wrong For You" and "Easy On You", released July 27, 2018, are a clear reflection of her personality: an unapologetic blend of charm and confidence.

On March 18, 2020, Livy released a new single, Finish This Up and continued her move into pop music from her country music origins. She then released Sharing You (single) on May 8, 2020.

CMA Music Festival 
Livy Jeanne has earned the right to play at Nashville's CMA Fest Music Festival two years in a row.

In 2017, she landed herself a spot on the Music City Stage, located in the Nashville Visitor Center at Bridgestone Arena, which showcases some of the genre's rising talent.

Then returning in 2018, Jeanne played the Nashville Acoustic Corner Stage, which was sponsored by SESAC SESAC.

Discography

Studio albums

Extended plays

Singles

Music videos

References

External links 
 

Canadian women country singers
Living people
Musicians from Thunder Bay
Universal Music Group artists
21st-century Canadian women singers
Year of birth missing (living people)